The 2009 NAWIRA Women's Rugby Championship was a 15 a-side championship that was hosted by the Barbados Rugby Union, it was held between June 21 and 27 at the Garrison Savannah, Bridgetown, Barbados.

According to NAWIRA competing teams were expected to be Barbados, Guyana, Trinidad & Tobago, Cayman Islands, Jamaica, and St Vincent & the Grenadines. However, Guyana - the favourites - withdrew a few weeks before the tournament citing financial difficulties, and Jamaica then withdrew on the eve of the event for similar reasons. The result was a very one-sided affair, with Trinidad retaining their title without conceding a point.

The tournament included test match debuts for both Barbados and St Vincent - and for both it was a painful introduction to the game. Barbados were blown away by the Caymans in their opening game - the visitors being "just too big and rough for [Barbados'] young inexperienced side" while their second game ended early due to injury.

St Vincent's debut was not different. In their opening game "the scrums went uncontested after about ten minutes as they just could not cope with the pressure. As it was they had some nasty injuries, so that made things even worse".

Table

Results

References 

Women's rugby union competitions for national teams
Rugby union competitions in North America
Rugby union competitions in the Caribbean
Women's rugby union in North America